Bara is a commune in Timiș County, Romania. It is composed of five villages: Bara (commune seat), Dobrești, Lăpușnic, Rădmănești and Spata. Bara is located in the northeast of Timiș County, in a hilly area, 70 km from Timișoara and 30 km from Lugoj.

History 
The first recorded mention of Bara dates from 1367. The name Bara is of Slavic origin and, in medieval documents, is associated with the description "terra acquosa", meaning a marshy land. In 1440 Bara is taken from the prefect of Timiș by King Vladislav I and given to the Șoimoș Fortress. By 1477 it was the property of the prefect of Pozsony, Miklós Bánffy. Under the Turks it was destroyed and re-established in 1690–1700. In 1879 Bara was bought by Pavel Teodorescu and Constantin Florea. The village was Romanian and remained mostly Romanian during the Austro-Hungarian rule.

All the villages in the commune were massively depopulated after World War II. Spata, for instance, became a ghost village in 1997 with the death of the last native. However, the settlement was repopulated by several families of Transylvanian shepherds.

Demographics 

Bara had a population of 388 inhabitants at the 2011 census, up 3% from the 2002 census. Most inhabitants are Romanians (97.94%). For 1.8% of the population, ethnicity is unknown. By religion, most inhabitants are Orthodox (97.42%). For 1.8% of the population, religious affiliation is unknown.

Notable people 
 Daniel Ciobotea (b. 1951), Patriarch of the Romanian Orthodox Church (2007–present)

References 

Communes in Timiș County
Localities in Romanian Banat